Sir Gerald Hubert Edward Busson du Maurier (26 March 1873 – 11 April 1934) was an English actor and manager. He was the son of author George du Maurier and his wife, Emma Wightwick, and the brother of Sylvia Llewelyn Davies. In 1903, he married the actress Muriel Beaumont, with whom he had three daughters: writers Angela du Maurier (1904–2002) and Daphne du Maurier (1907–1989), and painter Jeanne du Maurier (1911–1997). His popularity was due to his subtle and naturalistic acting: a "delicately realistic style of acting that sought to suggest rather than to state the deeper emotions". His Times obituary said of his career: "His parentage assured him of engagements in the best of company to begin with; but it was his own talent that took advantage of them."

Early life

Gerald Hubert Edward Busson du Maurier was born on 26 March 1873 in Hampstead, London, the son of Emma (Wightwick) and George du Maurier, author and Punch cartoonist, who created the character of Svengali in the 1894 novel Trilby.

He attended Heath Mount School and Harrow School. He initially pursued a career in business, but it did not suit him, and he began working as an actor. He obtained his first engagement, a small part in Sydney Grundy's An Old Jew, by means of his father's friend John Hare, manager of the Garrick Theatre.

J.M. Barrie
After playing a number of small roles before 1900, including a part in his father's popular drama Trilby with Herbert Beerbohm Tree in 1895, his popularity became assured as a result of his acclaimed performance in major roles during the premieres of two J.M. Barrie plays: as Ernest in The Admirable Crichton during 1902, and the dual role of George Darling and Captain Hook (instead of Seymour Hicks, who had refused the part) in Peter Pan, or The Boy Who Wouldn't Grow Up, at the Duke of York's Theatre, London, on 27 December 1904. He also played in other Barrie plays, including Dear Brutus.

In 1902, during The Admirable Crichton, also in the cast was actress Muriel Beaumont as Lady Agatha. They were married five months later on 11 April 1903 at St Peter, Cranley Gardens, Kensington. Du Maurier and his wife had three children: the actress and writer Angela du Maurier (1904–2002), the writer Daphne du Maurier (1907–1989) and the painter Jeanne du Maurier (1911–1997). His wife retired from the stage in 1910.

His nephews, his sister Sylvia Llewelyn Davies's sons, were the inspiration for Peter Pan and other boy characters of Barrie's fiction. The character of Wendy Darling in Peter Pan shares one of her middle names with du Maurier's daughter Angela, who in later years portrayed Wendy onstage herself.

Theatre
With Frank Curzon, he co-managed Wyndham's Theatre from 1910 to 1925, and then worked for the St James's Theatre. Knighted during 1922 at the maximum of his popularity, he continued to perform throughout his life. During later years he acted cinema roles such as Lord Camber's Ladies (1932), a German doctor in I Was a Spy (1933), the emperor's valet in Catherine the Great (1934) and, soon before his final illness, Wessensee in the Michael Balcon version of Jew Süss (1934).

Du Maurier cigarettes
Du Maurier was a regular cigarette smoker, and the du Maurier brand was named after him as a paid endorsement deal (he did not smoke them himself), to which he agreed to help pay taxes owed.

Charity work
He served as President of the Actors' Orphanage Fund (now the Actors' Charitable Trust) from 1914 to his death, when he was succeeded by Noël Coward.

Freemason
He joined the Freemasons' Green Room Lodge No. 2957 on 4 November 1904, an actors' lodge which included Leedham Bantock, Fred Terry and George Grossmith Jr. among its members.

Death

He died on 11 April 1934 of colon cancer, at Cannon Hall, Cannon Place, Hampstead, his home since 1916. A blue plaque has been placed at the house in his memory.

His middle daughter Daphne refused to attend his funeral but wrote a biography of him – Gerald: A Portrait – which was published soon after his death.

Filmography

Selected stage credits
 Bulldog Drummond with H.C. McNeile (1921)
 The Dancers by Viola Tree (1923)
 Behold, We Live by John Van Druten (1932)

References and sources
References

Sources
Sir Gerald du Maurier, Actor, Manager and Producer, Obituary, The Times, 12 April 1934
James Harding, "Du Maurier, Sir Gerald Hubert Edward Busson (1873–1934)", Oxford Dictionary of National Biography, Oxford University Press, 2004 accessed 10 Sept 2007

External links

 
 The Admirable Crichton – 1902 production, The Play Pictorial No. XI (1903).
 Gerald du Maurier at University of Exeter Special Collections

1873 births
1934 deaths
English male film actors
English male silent film actors
English male stage actors
English theatre directors
Actor-managers
English Freemasons
English people of French descent
People educated at Harrow School
Actors awarded knighthoods
People educated at Heath Mount School
20th-century English male actors
Knights Bachelor
Gerald